The Bahoruco is the male volleyball team of Bahoruco.

History
The team was founded in 2007.

Current volleyball squad
As of December 2008

Coach:  Elias Geraldo

Assistant coach:  José Ventura

Release or Transfer

Palmares

National competition 
National league Runner-Up: 2

References

External links
League official website

Dominican Republic volleyball clubs
Volleyball clubs established in 2007